Actuate may refer to:

 Actuate Corporation
 The action of an actuator